Five Red Tulips (French: Cinq tulipes rouges) is a 1949 French crime film directed by Jean Stelli and starring René Dary, Suzanne Dehelly and Raymond Bussières. It was shot at the Billancourt Studios in Paris and on location around the city and across France. The film's sets were designed by the art director Jacques Colombier.

Synopsis
During the Tour de France, five riders are murdered. Each body is left with a red tulip nearby. A journalist and a police inspector investigate and arrest the murderer at the race's conclusion at the Parc des Princes in Paris.

Cast
 René Dary as Pierre Lusanne 
 Suzanne Dehelly as Colonelle 
 Raymond Bussières as Albert 'La Puce' Jacquin 
 Pierre-Louis as Charolles 
 Robert Berri as Jacques Mauval  
 Robert Le Fort as Basile  
 Emilio Carrer as Gambarra  
 Robert Blome as Jef Dooksen 
 René Robert 
 Luc Andrieux as Charles Brugeat  
 Roger Bontemps as Un reporter  
 Marian 
 Jean-Jacques Lécot
 Claude Larry 
 Bob d'Arcy
 Jean Debray as Tonnelier  
 Jean Nosserot as Fuseau  
 Émile Genevois as Robert 
 Coussolle 
 Orgaert 
 Marcel Loche 
 René Hell 
 Edith Guarini 
 Annette Poivre as Annette Jacquin  
 Jean Brochard as L'inspecteur-chef Honoré Ricoul 
 Albert Broquin as Un mécano 
 Maguy Horiot 
 Frédéric Mariotti as Un inspecteur  
 Jacques Mattler as Le directeur de la P.J.
 Fernand Mithouard as Max Everkampf
 Marcelle Rexiane as La caissière
 René Stern as Le maître d'hôtel

References

Bibliography 
 Rège, Philippe. Encyclopedia of French Film Directors, Volume 1. Scarecrow Press, 2009.

External links 
 

1949 films
1949 crime films
1940s sports films
French crime films
French sports films
Films set in France
1940s French-language films
Films directed by Jean Stelli
Cycling films
French black-and-white films
1940s French films
Films set in Paris
Films shot in Paris
Films shot at Billancourt Studios